Matheus is a Portuguese given name: Notable people with the name include:

 Matheus Aiás (born 1996), Brazilian footballer
 Matheus Alessandro (born 1996), Brazilian footballer
 Matheus Pucinelli de Almeida (born 2001), Brazilian tennis player
 Matheus Alueendo (born 1961), Namibian military officer
 Matheus Alves (born 1993), Brazilian footballer
 Matheus Anjos (born 1998), Brazilian soccer player
 Matheus Augusto (born 1996), Brazilian footballer
 Matheus Babi (born 1997), Brazilian footballer
 Matheus Banguelê (born 1996), Brazilian footballer
 Matheus Barbosa (born 1994), Brazilian footballer
 Matheus dos Santos Batista (born 1995), Brazilian footballer
 Matheus Bertotto (born 1993), Brazilian footballer
 Matheus Bissi (born 1991), Brazilian footballer
 Matheus Biteco (1995-2016), Brazilian footballer
 Matheus Borges (born 1993), Brazilian hockey player
 Matheus Cotulio Bossa (born 1993), Brazilian footballer
 Matheus Simonte Bressaneli (born 1993), Brazilian footballer
 Matheus Bueno (born 1998), Brazilian footballer
 Matheus Butrymowicz (1745-1814), Polish-Lithuanian statesman and landlord
 Matheus Carvalho (born 1992), Brazilian footballer
 Matheus Cassini (born 1996), Brazilian footballer
 Matheus de Castro (1569-1677), first Catholic bishop from India
 Matheus Cavichioli (born 1986), Brazilian footballer
 Matheus Costa (born 1995), Brazilian football player
 Matheus Costa (football manager) (born 1987), Brazilian football manager
 Matheus Cuello (born 1995), Uruguayan footballer
 Matheus Cunha (born 1999), Brazilian footballer
 Matheus Dantas (born 1998), Brazilian footballer
 Matheus Davó (born 1999), Brazilian footballer
 Matheus Diovany (born 1994), Brazilian footballer
 Matheus Fernandes (born 1998), Brazilian footballer
 Matheus Ferraz (born 1985), Brazilian footballer
 Matheus Frizzo (born 1998), Brazilian footballer
 Matheus Galdezani (born 1992), Brazilian footballer
 Matheus Gonçalves (born 1994), Brazilian footballer
 Matheus Henrique (born 1997), Brazilian footballer
 Matheus Iacovelli (born 1998), Brazilian footballer
 Matheus Menezes Jácomo (born 1991), Brazilian footballer
 Matheus Jesus (born 1997), Brazilian footballer
 Matheus de Sancto Johanne (died 1391), French composer
 Matheus de Layens (died 1483), Belgian architect
 Matheus Leist (born 1998), Brazilian racing driver
 Matheus Leoni (born 1991), Brazilian footballer
 Matheus Lopes (born 1985), Brazilian football defender
 Matheus Dória Macedo (born 1994), Brazilian footballer
 Matheus Machado (born 2001), Brazilian footballer
 Matheus Lima Magalhães (born 1992), Brazilian footballer
 Matheus Mancini (born 1994), Brazilian footballer
 Matheus Marcondes (born 1903), Brazilian long-distance runner
 Matheus Mascarenhas (born 1998), Brazilian footballer
 Matheus Matias (born 1998), Brazilian footballer
 Matheus Humberto Maximiano (born 1989), Brazilian footballer
 Matheus Nachtergaele (born 1968), Brazilian actor
 Matheus Leite Nascimento (born 1983), Brazilian footballer
 Matheus Neris (born 1999), Brazilian footballer
 Matheus Nicolau (born 1993), Brazilian mixed martial artist
 Matheus Nolasco (born 1995), Brazilian footballer
 Matheus Nunes (born 1998), Brazilian footballer
 Matheus Oliveira (born 1994), Brazilian footballer
 Matheus Ortigoza (born 1993), Brazilian footballer
 Matheus Pato (born 1995), Brazilian footballer
 Matheus Peixoto (born 1995), Brazilian footballer
 Matheus Pereira (born 1996), Brazilian footballer
 Matheus Pereira (born 1998), Brazilian footballer
 Matheus Reis (born 1995), Brazilian footballer
 Matheus Rezende (born 1995), Brazilian footballer
 Matheus Ribeiro (born 1993), Brazilian footballer
 Matheus Rocha (born 1998), Brazilian footballer
 Matheus Rodrigues (born 1996), Brazilian football player
 Matheus Rossetto (born 1996), Brazilian footballer
 Matheus Sales (born 1995), Brazilian footballer
 Matheus Salustiano (born 1993), Brazilian footballer
 Matheus Santana (born 1996), Brazilian swimmer
 Matheus Isaías dos Santos (born 1996), Brazilian footballer
 Matheus Oliveira Santos (born 1997), Brazilian footballer
 Matheus Santos (volleyball) (born 1996), Brazilian volleyball player
 Matheus Sávio (born 1997), Brazilian footballer
 Matheus Shikongo (born 1950), Namibian politician
 Matheus da Silva (born 2000), Brazilian footballer
 Matheus Nogueira da Silva (born 1986), Brazilian footballer
 Matheus Silva (born 1996), Brazilian footballer
 Matheus Thuler (born 1999), Brazilian footballer
 Matheus Vargas (born 1996), Brazilian footballer
 Matheus Caldeira Vidotto (born 1993), Brazilian footballer
 Matheus Coradini Vivian (born 1982), Brazilian footballer

Surname

 Carlos Matheus (born 1984), Brazilian mathematician
 Carlos César Matheus (born 1984), Brazilian football midfielder
 Giovanna Venetiglio Matheus (born 1989), Brazilian trampoline gymnast
 Jean Matheus (1590-1672), French engraver
 Jonas Matheus (born 1986), Namibian boxer
 Michael Matheus (born 1953), German historian
 Rosângela Matheus (born 1963), Brazilian politician
 William Matheus (born 1990), Brazilian footballer

See also
Matthias
Mateus (name)

Portuguese masculine given names
Portuguese-language surnames